The 1887 Grand National was the 49th renewal of the renewal of the Grand National horse race that took place at Aintree Racecourse near Liverpool, England, on 25 March 1887.

Finishing Order

Non-finishers

References

 1887
Grand National
Grand National
19th century in Lancashire